Villaputzu ( or ) is a municipality in the Province of South Sardinia in the Italian region and island of Sardinia, located about  northeast of the Sardinian capital Cagliari. It is located in a short plain at the mouth of the Flumendosa river, next to the Sarrabus hill.

The village of Villaputzu is a part of the historic region of Sarrabus, whose municipalities are Villaputzu, Muravera, San Vito and Castiadas.

Villaputzu was the birthplace of  launeddas instrumentist Efisio Melis.

References

External links

 Official website

Cities and towns in Sardinia